Caryn Erena Paewai (born 27 August 1975) is a former field hockey player from New Zealand, who finished in sixth position with the Women's National Team, nicknamed Black Sticks, at the 2000 Summer Olympics in Sydney, Australia. Two years later she was a member of the side that finished fourth at the 2002 Commonwealth Games in Manchester, United Kingdom. She was born in Dannevirke.

External links

 New Zealand Olympic Committee
 

New Zealand female field hockey players
Field hockey players at the 2000 Summer Olympics
Field hockey players at the 2008 Summer Olympics
Olympic field hockey players of New Zealand
1975 births
Living people
Sportspeople from Dannevirke
Field hockey players at the 2002 Commonwealth Games
Commonwealth Games competitors for New Zealand
21st-century New Zealand women